Vanadium trichloride is the inorganic compound with the formula VCl3. This purple salt is a common precursor to other vanadium(III) complexes.

Structure
VCl3 has the common BiI3 structure, a motif that features hexagonally closest-packed chloride framework with vanadium ions occupying the octahedral holes. VBr3 and VI3 adopt the same structure, but VF3 features a structure more closely related to ReO3. VCl3 is paramagnetic and has two unpaired electrons.

Preparation and reactions
VCl3 is prepared by heating VCl4 at 160–170 °C under a flowing stream of inert gas, which sweeps out the Cl2. The bright red liquid converts to a purple solid.

Heating of VCl3 decomposes with volatilization of VCl4, leaving VCl2. Upon heating under H2 at 675 °C (but less than 700 °C), VCl3 reduces to greenish VCl2.
 2 VCl3 + H2 → 2 VCl2 + 2 HCl

Comproportionation of vanadium trichloride and vanadium(V) oxides gives vanadium oxydichloride:
V2O5  +  VOCl3  +  3 VCl3  →  6 VOCl2

Vanadium trichloride catalyses the pinacol coupling reaction of benzaldehyde (PhCHO) to 1,2-diphenyl-1,2-ethanediol by various reducing metals such as zinc:
Zn + 2 H2O + 2 PhCHO → (PhCH(OH))2 + Zn(OH)2

Complexes
VCl3 forms colorful adducts and derivatives with a broad scale of ligands. VCl3 dissolves in water to give the hexahydrate, but the formula is deceptive. The salt is described by the formula [VCl2(H2O)4]Cl.2H2O. In other words, two of the water molecules are not bound to the vanadium, whose structure resembles the corresponding Fe(III) derivative. Removal of the two bound chloride ligands from [VCl2(H2O)4]+ in aqueous solution gives the green ion [V(H2O)6]3+.

With tetrahydrofuran, VCl3 forms the red/pink complex VCl3(THF)3. Vanadium(III) chloride reacts with acetonitrile to give the green adduct VCl3(MeCN)3. When treated with KCN, VCl3 converts to [V(CN)7]4− (early metals commonly adopt coordination numbers greater than 6 with compact ligands). Complementarily, larger metals can form complexes with rather bulky ligands. This aspect is illustrated by the isolation of VCl3(NMe3)2, containing two bulky NMe3 ligands.

Organometallic derivatives
Vanadium(III) chloride as its thf complex is a precursor toV(mesityl)3.
 VCl3(THF)3 + 3 LiC6H2-2,4,6-Me3 → V(C6H2-2,4,6-Me3)3(THF) + 3 LiCl

References

Vanadium(III) compounds
Chlorides
Metal halides